The Thomas J. Calloway House, constructed in 1910, stands on the south side of Elm Street adjacent to Crescent Avenue in the traditionally African-American neighborhood of Lincoln in Lanham, Prince George's County, Maryland. It is credited to Isaiah T. Hatton, an early African-American architect.

Thomas Junius Calloway was a prominent lawyer, educator, civil servant, and African American activist until his death in 1930. He was vice president and general manager of the Lincoln Land Improvement Company and served as first principal of the Lincoln School. The house is a -story, wood-frame Foursquare residence with a poured concrete foundation.  The house retains its original plan and is still in use as a residence.

It was listed on the National Register of Historic Places in 2005.

References

External links
, including photo in 1995, at Maryland Historical Trust website
 M-NCPPC African-American Heritage Survey, October 1996: Thomas J. Calloway House, entry 70-49-33 p. 48

Houses completed in 1910
Houses in Prince George's County, Maryland
Houses on the National Register of Historic Places in Maryland
African-American history of Prince George's County, Maryland
Lanham, Maryland
National Register of Historic Places in Prince George's County, Maryland
1910 establishments in Maryland